Albert J. "Budd" Johnson III (December 14, 1910 – October 20, 1984) was an American jazz saxophonist and clarinetist who worked extensively with, among others, Ben Webster, Benny Goodman, Big Joe Turner, Coleman Hawkins, Dizzy Gillespie, Duke Ellington, Quincy Jones, Count Basie, Billie Holiday and, especially, Earl Hines.

Life and career
Johnson initially played drums and piano before switching to tenor saxophone. In the 1920s, he performed in Texas and parts of the Midwest, working with Jesse Stone among others. Johnson had his recording debut while working with Louis Armstrong's band in 1932 to 1933, but he is more known for his work, over many years, with Earl Hines. It is contended that he and Billy Eckstine, Hines' long-term collaborator, led Hines to hire "modernists" in the birth of bebop, which came largely out of the Hines band.  Johnson was also an early figure in the bebop era, doing sessions with Coleman Hawkins in 1944. In the 1950s he led his own group, and did session work for Atlantic Records - he is the featured tenor saxophone soloist on Ruth Brown's hit "Teardrops from My Eyes".  In the mid-1960s, he began working and recording again with Hines. His association with Hines is his longest lasting and most significant. In 1975, he began working with the New York Jazz Repertory Orchestra. He was inducted into the Big Band and Jazz Hall of Fame in 1993.  His grandson, Albert Johnson (aka Prodigy), was a member of the hip-hop duo Mobb Deep.

He died of a heart attack in Kansas City at the age of 73.

Discography

As leader/coleader
1958: Blues a la Mode (Felsted) 
1960: Budd Johnson and the Four Brass Giants (Riverside) with Ray Nance, Clark Terry, Nat Adderley and Harry Edison
1960: Let's Swing! (Swingville)
1963: French Cookin' (Argo)
1964: Ya! Ya! (Argo)
1964: Off the Wall (Argo) with Joe Newman
1970: Ya! Ya! (Black & Blue)
1974: The Dirty Old Men (Black & Blue) with Earl Hines - rereleased as Mr. Bechet		
1978: In Memory of a Very Dear Friend (Dragon)
1984: The Old Dude and the Fundance Kid (Uptown) with Phil Woods

As sideman
With Cannonball Adderley
Domination (Capitol, 1965)
With Count Basie
The Legend (Roulette, 1961)
Kansas City 8: Get Together (1979)
With Ruth Brown 
Miss Rhythm (Atlantic, 1959)
With Benny Carter
'Live and Well in Japan! (Pablo Live, 1978)
With Roy Eldridge
What It's All About (Pablo, 1976)
With Duke Ellington and Count Basie
First Time! The Count Meets the Duke (Columbia, 1961)
With Gil Evans
Great Jazz Standards (Pacific Jazz, 1959)
Out of the Cool (Impulse!, 1960)
With Dizzy Gillespie
The Complete RCA Victor Recordings (Bluebird, 1937-1949 [1995])
Dee Gee Days: The Savoy Sessions (Savoy, 1951-1952 [1976])
Jazz Recital (Norgran, 1955)
With Coleman Hawkins
Rainbow Mist (Delmark, 1944 [1992]) compilation of Apollo recordings
With Earl Hines
The Father Jumps (Bluebird, 1939-1945 [1975])
With Claude Hopkins
 Swing Time! (Swingville, 1963) with Vic Dickenson	
With Etta Jones
Lonely and Blue (Prestige, 1962)
With Quincy Jones
The Birth of a Band! (Mercury, 1959)
The Great Wide World of Quincy Jones (Mercury, 1959)
I Dig Dancers (Mercury, 1960)
Quincy Plays for Pussycats (Mercury, 1959-65 [1965])
With Jimmy McGriff
The Big Band (Solid State, 1966)
With Carmen McRae
Something to Swing About (Kapp, 1959)
With Bud Powell
Earl Bud Powell, Vol. 1: Early Years of a Genius, 44–48 (1948)
With Carrie Smith
Carrie Smith (West 54 Records, 1978)
With Jimmy Smith
Monster (Verve, 1965)With Sonny StittBroadway Soul (Colpix, 1965)With Clark TerryColor Changes (Candid, 1960)
Clark Terry Plays the Jazz Version of All American (Moodsville, 1962)With Ben WebsterBen Webster and Associates (Verve, 1959)With Randy WestonUhuru Afrika (Roulette, 1960)
Highlife (Colpix, 1963)
Tanjah (Polydor, 1973)

As arrangerWith Jimmy Witherspoon' Goin' to Kansas City Blues'' (RCA Victor, 1958) with Jay McShann

References

External links
Budd Johnson at Discogs.com

Music web
BBC Radio 2 bio
Budd Johnson manuscript scores collection, Institute of Jazz Studies, Rutgers University
Albert J. "Budd" Johnson manuscript scores and other material, 1910-1984 at Isham Memorial Library, Harvard University

Swing clarinetists
American jazz saxophonists
American male saxophonists
American jazz clarinetists
Musicians from Dallas
Riverside Records artists
1910 births
1984 deaths
20th-century American saxophonists
Jazz musicians from Texas
20th-century American male musicians
American male jazz musicians
New York Jazz Repertory Company members
Black & Blue Records artists
Argo Records artists